Albert McPherson (8 July 1927 – 11 January 2015) was an English professional footballer who played as a centre half.

Career
Born in Salford, McPherson played for Royal Engineers, Bury, Stalybridge Celtic and Walsall.

He played youth football with the Salford Lads Club, alongside Steve Fleet, Eddie Colman and Brian Doyle.

He later worked as a coach at West Bromwich Albion.

References

1927 births
2015 deaths
English footballers
Royal Engineers A.F.C. players
Bury F.C. players
Stalybridge Celtic F.C. players
Walsall F.C. players
English Football League players
Association football central defenders
West Bromwich Albion F.C. non-playing staff
Footballers from Salford